LASIK MD is a North America provider of laser vision correction and the largest provider of laser vision correction in North America based on procedure volume. As of 2013, LASIK MD performs over sixty percent of all laser vision correction procedures in Canada.

LASIK MD was founded in 2001 by Dr. Mark Cohen and Dr. Avi Wallerstein with two initial clinics in Montreal, Quebec, Canada and Toronto, Ontario, Canada. As of 2019, there are 34 LASIK MD eye centres located across Canada. The clinics serve all major metropolitan areas throughout Canada. LASIK MD is a provider of vision correction procedures, performing LASIK, PRK, presbyopia and keratoconus treatments.  The LASIK MD centre in Montreal is the largest private eye care centre in the province of Quebec and also performs cataract surgeries.

The LASIK MD Montreal location is a LASIK training centre for Canadian laser eye surgeons. It is a non-hospital based facility accredited by the College of Physicians of Quebec for the training of laser vision correction to ophthalmic surgery residents. This accreditation was obtained via the University of Sherbrooke.

History

In 1998, Lasik Vision Corporation was the first laser vision correction provider in North America to offer "affordable, value-pricing" and to promote it with direct-to-consumer advertising. At the time, this was a new approach for a medical services company and allowed it to capitalize on a larger mass appeal for the procedure. Dr. Wallerstein was the National Medical Director of LASIK Vision Corporation and oversaw medical standardization, and Dr. Cohen was the National Director of Professional Affairs and oversaw physician recruitment and training.  By 2000, Lasik Vision Corporation, a publicly traded corporation, became the largest laser vision company in the world, as measured by procedure volume.

However, soon after its bankruptcy in 2001, Cohen and Wallerstein left LASIK Vision to implement a similar medical model in a group of privately owned facilities.  These centres operate under the name LASIK MD.  LASIK MD subsequently acquired the majority of the former Lasik Vision facilities in bankruptcy proceedings in Canada.

Awards
In 2013, LASIK MD earned Platinum Club status in Canada's Best Managed Companies competition sponsored by Deloitte, CIBC, the National Post and Queen's School of Business. Platinum Club status is awarded to those organizations who have been Best Managed Companies for seven consecutive years or more. LASIK MD was presented with a Special National Citation in honour of Service Excellence at the Ernst & Young 2008 Entrepreneur of the Year Awards. LASIK MD has been voted as a Consumer Choice Award Canada winner in the Laser Vision Correction category for every year since 2008.

References

External links 
 LASIK MD

Health care companies of Canada
Ophthalmology organizations
LASIK
Organizations established in 2001
2001 establishments in Ontario
2001 establishments in Quebec